Portulaca sedifolia is a species of flowering plant in the purslane family, Portulacaceae, that is endemic to Yemen. Its natural habitat is rocky areas.

References

sedifolia
Endemic flora of Socotra
Endangered plants
Taxonomy articles created by Polbot
Taxa named by N. E. Brown